Boris Becker defeated Kevin Curren in the final, 6–3, 6–7(4–7), 7–6(7–3), 6–4 to win the gentlemen's singles tennis title at the 1985 Wimbledon Championships. This latter record would eventually be broken by Michael Chang at the 1989 French Open.

John McEnroe was the two-time defending champion, but lost in the quarterfinals to Curren. Curren also defeated Jimmy Connors in the semifinals and became the first player ever to defeat both Connors and McEnroe at the same major.

Seeds

  John McEnroe (quarterfinals)
  Ivan Lendl (fourth round)
  Jimmy Connors (semifinals)
  Mats Wilander (first round)
  Anders Järryd (semifinals)
  Pat Cash (second round)
  Joakim Nyström (third round)
  Kevin Curren (final)
  Johan Kriek (third round)
  Aaron Krickstein (first round)
  Yannick Noah (third round)
  Miloslav Mečíř (first round)
  Eliot Teltscher (second round)
  Stefan Edberg (fourth round)
  Tomáš Šmíd (second round)
  Tim Mayotte (fourth round)

Qualifying

Draw

Finals

Top half

Section 1

Section 2

Section 3

Section 4

Bottom half

Section 5

Section 6

Section 7

Section 8

References

External links

 1985 Wimbledon Championships – Men's draws and results at the International Tennis Federation

Men's Singles
Wimbledon Championship by year – Men's singles